On 30 November 2012, an Ilyushin Il-76 freighter aircraft,  operated by the Armenian cargo airline Air Highnesses on behalf of  Congolese cargo airline Aéro-Service, crashed on landing at Brazzaville, Republic of the Congo, killing all six occupants and 26 people on the ground.

The aircraft caught fire and was destroyed, killing all five Armenian crew and an Armenian policeman present on board, as well as 26 local residents, injuring a further 14. The aircraft was initially mistakenly attributed to Trans Air Congo.

Investigation
In February 2013, the Russian Interstate Aviation Committee (IAC) received the flight data recorder and the cockpit voice recorder for analysis on behalf of the Ministry of Transport of Congo, and was working to download the data.

References

2012 disasters in the Republic of the Congo
November 2012 events in Africa
Aviation accidents and incidents in 2012
Aviation accidents and incidents in the Republic of the Congo
Accidents and incidents involving the Ilyushin Il-76
Airliner accidents and incidents with an unknown cause